Evelyn Rowland Esmond Baring, 4th Earl of Cromer (born 3 June 1946) styled Viscount Errington from 1953 to 1991, is a British peer and business man. He was managing director of Inchcape (China) Ltd and a director of Schroder Asia Pacific Fund PLC. As Earl of Cromer, he was a member of the House of Lords from 1991 to 1999.

The son of Rowland Baring, 3rd Earl of Cromer, and his wife Esmé Mary Gabrielle Harmsworth, a daughter of Esmond Harmsworth, 2nd Viscount Rothermere, he was educated at Eton College. He was managing director of Inchcape (China) Ltd between 1979 and 1994 and a director of Schroder Asia Pacific Fund PLC between 1995 and 2003.

In 1991 he succeeded his father as Earl of Cromer, Viscount Errington, Viscount Cromer, and Baron Cromer. As a member of the House of Lords from 1991 to 1999, he is not recorded as having ever spoken there.

On 25 October 1971, Baring married firstly Plern Isangkul Na Ayuddya, a daughter of Dr. Charanpat Isangkul Na Ayuddya. They were divorced in 1992. In 1993 he married secondly Shelley Hu Cheng-Yu, daughter of Hu Guo-qin, with whom he has two children. They were divorced in 2019. 

Alexander Rowland Harmsworth Baring, Viscount Errington (born 1994)
Lady Venetia Baring (born 1998)

Notes

External links

1946 births
20th-century English businesspeople
People educated at Eton College
Alumni of Trinity College, Cambridge
British bankers
Earls in the Peerage of the United Kingdom
Living people
Evelyn Rowland
Cromer